Asociación Deportiva Siete Villas is a football team based in Castillo, Arnuero in the autonomous community of Cantabria. Founded in 1969 as Club Deportivo Siete Villas, the team plays in Tercera División RFEF – Group 3. The club's home ground is San Pedro, which has a capacity of 500 spectators.

History

Founded in 1969, CD Siete Villas played in the regional leagues until 1986, when they ceased activities. The club returned in 1993, under the name of SD Siete Villas, before changing to current name in 1999.

In its first season in Tercera División (2003–04) the club finished 13th. The following season was slightly better as Siete Villas finished 12th.

Club background
Club Deportivo Siete Villas – (1969–1986)
Sociedad Deportiva Siete Villas – (1993–1999)
Asociación Deportiva Siete Villas – (1999–present)

Season to season

18 seasons in Tercera División
1 season in Tercera División RFEF

References

External links
Futbolme team profile 
Profile

Football clubs in Cantabria
Association football clubs established in 1969
1969 establishments in Spain